Superman Returns: Fortress of Solitude is a puzzle video game, for the Game Boy Advance. It is the counterpart of Superman Returns. It features various puzzle challenge (one of which was Sudoku with superpowers) punctuated with short flying action sequences.

The gameplay is a mixture of sorts between sudoku levels and battles that the player must do in order to advance through the game.

The game got mixed reception upon release. GameSpot gave it a score of six out of ten, calling it "a passable puzzler that offers a decent selection of Sudoku-style puzzles."

References

Superman video games
Game Boy Advance games
Game Boy Advance-only games
2006 video games
Video games based on films
Video games based on adaptations
Video games based on works by Michael Dougherty
Video games developed in the United States
Superhero video games
Superman (1978 film series)
Video games set in the United States
Video games based on works by Dan Harris (screenwriter)
Single-player video games
Electronic Arts games